Mary Catherine Silber is a professor in the Department of Statistics at the University of Chicago who works on dynamical systems, in bifurcation theory and pattern formation.

Education and career
Silber completed her Ph.D. in physics from the University of California, Berkeley in 1989, under the supervision of Edgar Knobloch. Her dissertation was Bifurcations with  Symmetry and Spatial Pattern Selection.

After postdoctoral research at the University of Minnesota, Georgia Institute of Technology, and California Institute of Technology, she joined the Northwestern faculty in 1993. She moved to the Department of Statistics at the University of Chicago in 2015 as a faculty member in the Computational and Applied Mathematics Initiative. In 2020, Silber joined two other University of Chicago faculty members in representing the University on the Institute for Foundational Data Science. She is the Director of the Committee on Computational and Applied Mathematics, an interdisciplinary graduate program in computational and applied mathematics at the University of Chicago.

Awards and recognition
In 2012 Silber became a fellow of the Society for Industrial and Applied Mathematics "for contributions to the analysis of bifurcations in the presence of symmetry".

References

External links 
University of Chicago profile

Year of birth missing (living people)
Living people
20th-century American mathematicians
21st-century American mathematicians
American women mathematicians
21st-century American physicists
American women physicists
Sonoma State University alumni
University of California, Berkeley alumni
Northwestern University faculty
Fellows of the Society for Industrial and Applied Mathematics
University of Chicago faculty
20th-century women mathematicians
21st-century women mathematicians
20th-century American women
21st-century American women